Oak Hill Cemetery is a rural cemetery located in Cedar Rapids, Iowa, United States.  It was listed as a historic district on the National Register of Historic Places in 2013.  At the time of its nomination it consisted of 17 resources, which included 13 contributing buildings, one contributing site, two contributing structures, and one contributing object.

History
Cedar Rapids was platted on the east bank of the Cedar River as Rapids City in 1841, and it was incorporated in 1849. The first burials in the town were in what was called the village cemetery.  It was located at what is now Eighth Street and Fifth Avenue SE.  Oak Hill Cemetery was established as Rose Hill, also known as Mount Washington, in 1853 on farmland outside of town that belonged to Gabriel Carpenter and Freeman Smith.  The graves in the village cemetery were relocated here.  They include some of the founders of Cedar Rapids.

Chicago landscape architect Horace W.S. Cleveland was employed in 1869 and again in 1880 to prepare a plan for cemetery improvements giving it a rural picturesque landscape design.  The Cedar Rapids architectural firm of Josselyn & Taylor designed the main entryway on the northwest corner of the cemetery in 1908 as a memorial to Lawson Daniels.  It is composed of a gable-roofed shelter house, rustic stone walls and gateposts of cut glacial boulders, and decorative iron gates.  Landscape architect, Ossian C. Simonds was hired in 1911 to redesign a portion of the cemetery's landscape.  The buildings that contribute to the historic nature of the cemetery include the caretaker's house and garage, the barn, the gateway shelter house, and nine mausoleums. The contributing structures include the stone walls and gateposts.  The contributing objects include gravestones and monuments that are counted as a single object.  The designed landscape is the contributing site.

Notable burials
Charles A. Clark, Civil War Medal of Honor recipient
Edgar E. Clark, Grand Senior Conductor of the Order of Railway Conductors and Interstate Commerce Commission commissioner
Walter Donald Douglas, businessman who died in the Titanic disaster
John Ely, state-level politician instrumental in abolishing capital punishment in Iowa
John Taylor Hamilton, United States House of Representatives 1891-1893
George Greene, Iowa Supreme Court justice
Henry Otis Pratt, United States House of Representatives 1873-1877

References

Cemeteries on the National Register of Historic Places in Iowa
National Register of Historic Places in Cedar Rapids, Iowa
Historic districts in Cedar Rapids, Iowa
Historic districts on the National Register of Historic Places in Iowa
Geography of Cedar Rapids, Iowa
Rural cemeteries